The Order of Freedom is an award conferred by the Republic of Kosovo. Notable recipients include current President of the United States Joseph Biden (2009), former Prime Minister of the United Kingdom, Tony Blair (2016), United States Senator John McCain (2017), U.S. Air Force General David L. Goldfein (2017),
President of Albania Bujar Nishani (2017), former French prime minister Alain Juppé (2018), and former Presidents of the United States Bill Clinton (2019) and Donald Trump (2020).

See also
Orders, decorations, and medals of Kosovo

References

Civil awards and decorations
Orders, decorations, and medals of Kosovo